Fadel Jilal (born 4 March 1964) is a Moroccan football midfielder who played for Morocco in the 1986 FIFA World Cup. He also played for Wydad Casablanca.

References

External links
FIFA profile

1964 births
Moroccan footballers
Morocco international footballers
Association football midfielders
Wydad AC players
Botola players
1986 FIFA World Cup players
1992 African Cup of Nations players
Living people